Star Winds is the ninth science fiction novel by Barrington J. Bayley. In the future Solar System of the novel, humans travel through space using solar sails and, as with much of Bayley's work, alchemy and other pseudosciences play a role alongside more conventional technology.

Literary significance and reception
Rhys Hughes reviewed Star Winds and The Pillars of Eternity as "offbeat" but ultimately reworkings of earlier material.

Andrew Darlington made reference to the reworked theme of alchemy (first seen in Empire of Two Worlds) and argued that the first half of the novel, dealing with the actual journey from Earth to Mars, was stronger than the second, which moved out to a galactic venue. Darlington commented that Bayley's abandonment of his Martian setting may have been due to the influence of the Viking landings while the book was being written.

David Pringle noted that the distinctions between SF and fantasy were slight but that the book was still engaging.

References

1978 American novels
1978 science fiction novels
Novels by Barrington J. Bayley
DAW Books books